Confederation Garden Court is a plaza in Victoria, British Columbia, completed in 1967 to commemorate the Canadian Centennial of confederation. The plaza features the British Columbia Time Capsule and Confederation Fountain, and is maintained by the Legislative Assembly of British Columbia.

See also

 Canadian Confederation

References

External links
 

1967 establishments in British Columbia
1967 sculptures
Buildings and structures in Victoria, British Columbia
Fountains in Canada
Monuments and memorials in British Columbia